This is a list of all cricketers who have played first-class, List A or Twenty20 cricket for the Jamaica national cricket team in the West Indies. Seasons given are first and last seasons; the player did not necessarily play in all the intervening seasons.

A

 Sidney Abrahams, 1938–1951/52
 Edward Acton, 1894/95–1896/97
 Jimmy Adams, 1984/85–2000/01
 Donald Aitcheson, 1946
 Gerry Alexander, 1956/57–1959/60
 Fabian Allen, 2016/17–2018/19
 Samuel Allen, 1975/76
 Owen Allison, 1972/73
 Anthony Andrews, 1992/93–1995/96
 Melbourne Austin, 1989/90
 Richard Austin, 1974/75–1982/83

B

 Cleveland Bailey, 1946–1947/48
 GM Baines, 1901/02
 Orlando Baker, 2000/01
 Clive Banton, 1988/89–1989/90
 Kanute Barclay, 1954/55–1961/62
 Kenneth Barnett, 1965/66
 Arthur Barrett, 1966/67–1980/81
 Hopeton Barrett, 1983/84–1986
 Ivan Barrow, 1928/29–1946
 Carlton Baugh Sr., 1980/81–1982/83
 Carlton Baugh Jr., 2000/01–2015/16
 Alton Beckford, 2005/06
 Donald Beckford, 1931/32–1946/47
 Wilfred Beckford, 1926/27–1935/36
 Rohan Belight, 1994/95
 Herman Bennett, 1964/65–1969/70
 David Bernard, 2000–2015/16
 Henry Bicknell, 1926/27
 Alfred Binns, 1949/50–1956/57
 Michael Binns, 1926/27
 Jermaine Blackwood, 2011/12–2019/20
 Cyprian Bloomfield, 1925/26
 Colin Bloomfield, 1946/47–1947/48
 Arthur Bonitto, 1946–1951/52
 Colin Bonitto, 1946–1952/53
 Neville Bonitto, 1947/48–1956/57
 Nkrumah Bonner, 2009/10–2019/20
 Carl Boy, 1931/32–1935/36
 Gareth Breese, 1995/96–2005/06
 Frank Bronstorph, 1925/26
 Bevon Brown, 2003/04–2010/11
 Errol Brown, 1977/78–1984/85
 Gavon Brown, 2014/15–2016/17
 Odean Brown, 2003/04–2014/15
 Gordon Bryan, 2017/18–2019/20
 P Bryan, 1976/77
 Brian Buchanan, 2012/13–2013/14
 Dennis Bulli, 2015/16–2019/20
 Edward Burke, 1894/95
 Charles Burton, 1894/95–1905
 Cassius Burton, 2014/15
 Shimei Burton, 1995/96–1996/97
 Arthur Byng, 1896/97

C

 Edwin Calnick, 1957/58–1958
 Jimmy Cameron, 1946–1959/60
 John Cameron, 1946
 John Joseph Cameron, 1908/09–1927/28
 Clive Campbell, 1971/72
 Anthony Campbell, 1969/70–1979/80
 Herbert Campbell, 1925/26–1926/27
 John Campbell, 2012/13–2019/20
 Jon-Ross Campbell, 2009/10–2014/15
 Carlton Carter, 1988/89–1989/90
 Stephan Casey, 2017/18
 Harold Castle, 1894/95–1896/97
 Clifton Cawley, 1938
 Leonard Chambers, 1965/66–1974/75
 Charles Chandler, 1894/95–1896/97
 Herbert Chang, 1972/73–1982/83
 SC Chisholm, 1925/26-1926/27
 Maurice Clarke, 2004/05
 Rudolph Cohen, 1962/63–1966/67
 Andre Coley, 1997/98–1998/99
 Terrence Corke, 1983/84–1984/85
 Sheldon Cottrell, 2010/11–2015/16
 George Cox, 1904/05–1905
 Linval Crawford, 1987/88
 O'Neil Cruikshank, 1990/91–1991/92
 Wayne Cuff, 1995/96–2001/02
 Frank Cunningham, 1985/86–1987/88
 Lawrence Cunningham, 1985/86–1987/88
 Oswald Cunningham, 1938–1950/51
 Ryan Cunningham, 1998/99–2003/04

D

 Oscar Da Costa, 1928/29–1934/35
 Aaron Daley, 1982/83–1990/91
 Courtenay Daley, 1971/72–1975/76
 Cleveland Davidson, 1982/83–1993/94
 Winston Davis, 1962/63–1971/72
 Jason Dawes, 2008/09–2017/18
 Cecil De Cordova, 1896/97
 Charles Delgado, 1910/11
 Kenrick Dennis, 1986/87–1987/88
 Kamal Dennis, 2000
 Akeem Dewar, 2009/10–2010/11
 Tom Dewdney, 1954/55–1957/58
 Deron Dixon, 1984/85–1988/89
 Uton Dowe, 1969/70–1976/77
 Byron Drury, 1896/97
 Arthur Duff, 1904/05–1905
 Leroy Dujon, 1946/47
 Jeff Dujon, 1974/75–1992/93
 Henry Duncker, 1904/05–1910/11
 Andre Dwyer, 2006/07

E

 Kirk Ebanks, 1991/92–1992/93
 Kirk Edwards, 2015/16
 Yannick Elliott, 2008/09–2012/13

F

 William Farquharson, 1894/95–1896/97
 Walter Farquharson, 1887/88–1894/95
 Raymond Ferguson, 1998/99
 Laurie Fidee, 1947/48
 Shawn Findlay, 2003/04–2011/12
 Colin Fletcher, 1978/79–1982/83
 Castell Folkes, 1967/68–1970/71
 Clifton Folkes, 1990/91–1992/93
 Shane Ford, 1993/94–1998/99
 Frederick Foster, 1901/02–1924/25
 Gerald Foster, 1908/09–1925/26
 Maurice Foster, 1963/64–1977/78
 Robert Foster, 1910/11
 Zeniffe Fowler, 2012/13
 Prince Francis, 1982/83–1987/88
 Samuel Francis, 1977/78
 Victor Fray, 1966/67–1969/70
 Akim Frazer, 2018/19
 Michael Frederick, 1953/54
 Assad Fudadin, 2017/18–2019/20
 Hugh Fuller, 1949/50
 Dickie Fuller, 1934/35–1946/47

G

 Leon Garrick, 1996/97–2002/03
 Garth Garvey, 2017/18–2018/19
 Chris Gayle, 1998/99–2018/19
 Patrick Gayle, 1988/89–1993/94
 JM Gibb, 1887/88-1904/05
 Marlon Gibbs, 1995/96–1996/97
 Roy Gilchrist, 1956/57–1961/62
 Alford Givance, 1992/93
 George Gladstone, 1929/30
 Locksley Gooden, 1946/47–1947/48
 Stanley Goodridge, 1949/50–1953/54
 Colin Gordon, 1982/83
 Carlton Gordon, 1978/79
 Hylton Gordon, 1973/74–1979/80
 John Gordon, 1976/77–1983/84
 Nicholson Gordon, 2015/16–2019/20
 Steve Gordon, 1987/88–1993/94
 Steve Gordon, 1988/89
 Tyson Gordon, 2004/05
 Gary Graham, 2004/05
 Joe Grant, 1990/91–1995/96
 Derval Green, 2014/15–2019/20
 Teddy Griffith, 1959/60–1966/67
 Trevon Griffith, 2015/16–2017/18
 John Groves, 1931/32–1949/50
 Geoffrey Gunter, 1905

H

 V Hardy, 1927/28
 Howard Harris, 1998/99
 Olanza Harris, 2004/05
 Jermaine Harrison, 2015/16
 Paul Harrison, 2017/18
 Patrick Harty, 2019/20
 Ferdie Harvey, 1959/60–1966/67
 Neville Hawkins, 1963/64–1966/67
 William Haye, 1970–1976/77
 Robert Haynes, 1981/82–1996/97
 Clinton Headlam, 1957/58–1958
 George Headley, 1927/28–1953/54
 Ron Headley, 1965/66–1973/74
 Robert Healing, 1896/97
 Jackie Hendriks, 1953/54–1970
 Trevor Henry, 1975–1976/77
 Robert Herbert, 1896/97
 George Heron, 1985/86–1987/88
 Keith Hibbert, 2000–2008/09
 Wavell Hinds, 1996/97–2010/11
 Edward Hobson, 1905
 Michael Holding, 1972/73–1988/89
 Joseph Holt, 1905–1929/30
 John Holt, 1946–1961/62
 Robert Honiball, 1896/97
 Neil Hosang, 1974/75
 Edward Hull, 1901/02–1910/11
 Charles Hurditch, 1894/95
 Joseph Hutton, 1901/02
 Robert Hutton, 1904/05–1908/09
 Danza Hyatt, 2003/04–2014/15
 Leslie Hylton, 1926/27–1938/39

I
 Irvin Iffla, 1947/48–1949/50
 Lorenzo Ingram, 2003/04–2008/09

J

 Simon Jackson, 2010/11–2012/13
 Damion Jacobs, 2013/14–2017/18
 Hines Johnson, 1934/35–1950/51
 Milton Josephs, 1959/60–1961/62

K

 Henry Kennedy, 1904/05–1910/11
 Nigel Kennedy, 1987/88–1989/90
 Esmond Kentish, 1947/48–1956/57
 Maurice Kepple, 2002/03–2004/05
 Henry Kerr, 1904/05–1905
 Malcolm Kerr, 1901/02–1910/11
 Brandon King, 2014/15–2019/20
 Lester King, 1961/62–1967/68

L

 Tamar Lambert, 2000–2015/16
 Christopher Lamont, 2017/18–2019/20
 Ambrose Lawrence, 1924/25
 Cecil Lawson, 1971/72–1977/78
 Jermaine Lawson, 2001/02–2007/08
 Reynard Leveridge, 2016/17–2018/19
 Jermaine Levy, 2018/19
 Leonard Levy, 1961/62–1973/74
 Desmond Lewis, 1970–1975/76
 Frank Lewis, 1956/57–1958
 Kennar Lewis, 2011/12–2018/19
 Ramaal Lewis, 2014/15
 Wayne Lewis, 1984/85–1994/95
 George Linton, 1896/97–1901/02
 Gilbert Livingston, 1896/97–1904/05
 Leroy Lugg, 2021/22
 Vincent Lumsden, 1949/50–1959/60

M

 Andre McCarthy, 2012–2019/20
 Roy McCatty, 1968/69–1969/70
 Vincent McCormack, 1925/26
 Sidney McCutchin, 1894/95
 Evon McInnis, 2003/04–2004/05
 Arthur McKenzie, 1946/47–1947/48
 Brenton McKenzie, 1984/85
 Denville McKenzie, 1995/96–2000/01
 Neville Mckoy, 1970/71–1972/73
 Ken McLeod, 1983/84–1987/88
 John McLeod, 1951/52–1952/53
 N MacMahon, 1927/28
 Easton McMorris, 1956/57–1975
 Dwight Mais, 1998/99–2003/04
 Donovan Malcolm, 1980/81–1981/82
 Robert Maragh, 1956/57–1962/63
 Robert Marley, 1928/29–1946
 Kemar Marshall, 2009/10
 Xavier Marshall, 2004/05–2012/13
 Frank Martin, 1924/25–1929/30
 Lawson Matthews, 1962/63–1965/66
 Everton Mattis, 1976/77–1982/83
 Warran Medwynter, 2001/02
 Dwight Meikle, 1984/85
 Hiram Meikle, 1938
 Jamie Merchant, 2012/13–2019/20
 Thomas Mercier, 1910/11–1925/26
 Leonard Messado, 1938/39
 Othneil Miles, 1967/68–1975/76
 Donald Miller, 1961/62
 Horace Miller, 2008/09–2014/15
 Nikita Miller, 2004/05–2018/19
 Roy Miller, 1950/51–1953/54
 Marquino Mindley, 2014/15–2019/20
 Calbert Minott, 1952/53–1954/55
 Owen Mitchell, 1961/62–1964/65
 Charles Morales, 1924/25–1928/29
 Alexander Morgan, 1983/84
 Dean Morgan, 2006–2010
 Delroy Morgan, 1986/87–1999/00
 Lloyd Morgan, 1968/69–1972/73
 Samuel Morgan, 1969/70–1973/74
 Romaine Morrison, 2017/18
 Charles Morrison, 1904/05–1925/26
 Alfred Motta, 1904/05–1908/09
 M Moyston, 1904/05–1908/09
 George Mudie, 1931/32–1951/52
 Joseph Mullings, 1894/95–1896/97
 Leonard Mullings, 1954/55–1959/60
 Brian Murphy, 1993/94–2001/02

N

 Brendan Nash, 2007/08–2011/12
 Mark Neita, 1978/79–1991/92
 Wallwood Nelson, 1904/05–1908/09
 Noel Nethersole, 1926/27–1938
 Thomas Nicholson, 1908/09–1910/11
 Karl Nunes, 1924/25–1931/32

O
 Courtney O'Connor, 1986/87–1987/88
 Sydney Owen, 1896/97

P

 Donovan Pagon, 2002/03–2012
 Dixeth Palmer, 1990/91–1994/95
 Paul Palmer, 2015/16–2019/20
 Brenton Parchment, 2000–2012/13
 Hume Parris, 1961/62
 Clarence Passailaigue, 1929/30–1938/39
 Patrick Patterson, 1982/83–1997/98
 Roy Paul, 1971/72
 Frank Pearce, 1887/88–1908/09
 George Pearce, 1887/88–1894/95
 Orville Pennant, 1993/94–1994/95
 Nehemiah Perry, 1986/87–2003/04
 Ordelmo Peters, 1982/83–1989/90
 Louis Phillips, 1904/05–1908/09
 Raymond Phillips, 1925/26–1927/28
 Renford Pinnock, 1963/64–1974/75
 Wilfred Plummer, 1978/79
 CF Poole, 1896/97
 Ernest Poole, 1896/97
 Aston Powe, 1947/48
 Daren Powell, 2000/01–2009/10
 George Powell, 1981/82–1987/88
 Kirk Powell, 1996/97–1998/99
 Rovman Powell, 2015/16–2019/20
 Ricardo Powell, 1997/98–2003/04
 Sheldon Powell, 2006/07
 Tony Powell, 1991/92–1999/00
 John Prescod, 1947/48–1952/53
 Harold Pryce, 1954/55

R

 Allan Rae, 1946/47–1959/60
 Ernest Rae, 1924/25–1935/36
 Errol Rattigan, 1973/74
 Frederick Redwood, 1991/92–1995/96
 Horace Reid, 1961/62–1963/64
 O'Neil Richards, 1995/96–1998/99
 Andrew Richardson, 2003/04–2013/14
 Daniel Richmond, 1896/97
 Ken Rickards, 1946–1958
 Rueben Riley, 1925/26–1935/36
 Gladstone Robinson, 1963/64–1964/65
 Franklyn Rose, 1992/93–2002/03
 Lawrence Rowe, 1968/69–1982/83
 Ralph Royes, 1931/32
 Andre Russell, 2006/07–2017/18

S

 Pete Salmon, 2017/18–2019/20
 Marlon Samuels, 1996/97–2013/14
 Robert Samuels, 1988/89–2003/04
 Trevor Samuels, 1987/88
 Audley Sanson, 1998/99–2002/03
 Krishmar Santokie, 2007/08–2012/13
 Vernon Sasso, 1929/30–1931/32
 Luther Saunders, 1950/51–1951/52
 Ronald Savariau, 1976/77
 Bob Scarlett, 1963/64
 Reginald Scarlett, 1951/52–1959/60
 Alfred Scott, 1952/53–1953/54
 Tommy Scott, 1910/11–1934/35
 Damani Sewell, 2016/17–2017/18
 Henry Sewell, 1957/58–1959/60
 H Shannon, 1904/05–1910/11
 Robert Sidgwick, 1894/95
 Allan Silvera, 1924/25
 Donovan Sinclair, 2006–2008/09
 Matthew Sinclair, 1998/99–2003/04
 Denis Smith, 2019/20
 Frank Smith, 1938–1938/39
 George Smith, 1956/57
 Odean Smith, 2017/18
 Collie Smith, 1954/55–1957/58
 Samuel Snow, 1901/02–1910/11
 Richard Staple, 1989/90–1994/95
 Osmond Stephenson, 1927/28–1938/39
 Rae Stephenson, 1979/80
 Dwight Stewart, 2004/05
 Raymond Stewart, 2000
 AL Stoddart, 1904/05

T

 Arthur Tarilton, 1904/05
 William Tarver, 1901/02
 Jerome Taylor, 2002/03–2018/19
 Rohan Taylor, 1990/91–1991/92
 Steven Taylor, 2016/17–2017/18
 Aldane Thomas, 2012/13–2019/20
 Devon Thomas, 2015/16–2016/17
 Oshane Thomas, 2016/17–2019/20
 Shacaya Thomas, 2014/15–2016/17
 Clement Thompson, 1976/77–1984/85
 Dennis Thorbourne, 1949/50–1958
 Percival Tomlinson, 1980/81
 John Toone, 1894/95
 Jamie Trenchfield, 2006/07
 Marlon Tucker, 1979/80–1989/90
 Horace Tulloch, 1951/52–1961/62

U
 Samuel Uter, 1910/11

V

 Charles Valencia, 1901/02–1904/05
 Alf Valentine, 1949/50–1964/65
 Vincent Valentine, 1931/32–1938
 Mario Ventura, 1992/93–2003/04
 Bertie Verley, 1894/95–1896/97

W

 Gavin Wallace, 2008/09–2017/18
 Keno Wallace, 2014/15
 Courtney Walsh, 1981/82–2000/01
 Chadwick Walton, 2010/11–2018/19
 Dwight Washington, 2004/05–2005/06
 Chester Watson, 1957/58–1961/62
 Ken Weekes, 1938–1947/48
 Altemont Wellington, 1965/66–1968/69
 Livern Wellington, 1969/70–1970/71
 Everett Whittingham, 1975–1984/85
 Alwyn Williams, 2017/18–2019/20
 Basil Williams, 1969/70–1986
 Junior Williams, 1974/75–1982/83
 Kenroy Williams, 2018/19
 Lloyd Williams, 1957/58
 Laurie Williams, 1989/90–2002/03
 Medroy Williams, 1984/85
 N Williams, 1983/84
 Oraine Williams, 2016/17–2019/20
 Walford Williams, 1979/80
 Errol Wilson, 1982/83–1990/91
 Francis Wilson, 1904/05–1905
 G Withers, 1901/02
 Gerald Woollaston, 1957/58–1967/68
 Frank Worrell, 1947/48–1963/64
 Carl Wright, 1997/98–1999/00
 Edward Wright, 1901/02
 K Wright, 1998/99
 Lyndel Wright, 1968/69–1978/79
 Samuel Wright, 1958
 Ray Wynter, 1975–1982/83

Y
 Hubert Young, 1931/32
 Samuel Young, 1924/25–1927/28

Notes

References

Jamaica in international cricket
National